The dam of Belmeken is situated in the Rila Mountains in Bulgaria and is the highest reservoir on the Balkan peninsula.  There is a pumped-storage plant the Chaira Hydro Power Plant built between the lake and a lower basin. Part of the water stored in the lake is cycled back and forth through the pumped storage turbines, while the lakes outflow drains through tunnels to the Sestrimo Hydro Power Plant.

References

Dams in Bulgaria
Rila